Mark IV served as Greek Patriarch of Alexandria between 1385 and 1389.

References

14th-century Patriarchs of Alexandria